Darius Lionel Brooks (born April 30, 1963) is an American gospel musician. He started his music career, in 1990, with the release of, Simply Darius, by Sound of Gospel, and he would go on to release five more albums with his own label imprint, Journey Music Group. For three of these albums, they would chart on the Billboard Gospel Albums chart.

Early life
Brooks was born on April 30, 1963, in Chicago, Illinois as Darius Lionel Brooks.

Music career
His music recording career commenced in 1990, with the album, Simply Darius, and it was released on January 11, 1990, by Sound of Gospel. This album was his breakthrough released upon the Billboard Gospel Albums chart at No. 24. While the 2004 edition of Your Will was released on July 27, 2004, by EMI label, Chordant Receords, and this placed at No. 32 on the aforementioned chart. His subsequent album, My Soul, was released on April 4, 2006, by Journey Records, and this peaked at No. 16 on the Gospel Albums chart.

Discography

References

External links
 http://www.dariusbrooks.com

1963 births
Living people
African-American songwriters
African-American Christians
Musicians from Detroit
Musicians from Los Angeles
Songwriters from Michigan
Songwriters from California
21st-century African-American people
20th-century African-American people